Gary Finneran (April 17, 1964 – May 10, 2009), also known as "Gary X", was an American singer songwriter best known as the frontman for the band Ex-Idols. He was considered to be one of the best songwriters to have never been recognized, and was honored as such at his memorial.

Finneran gained critical acclaim and radio success with his band the Ex-Idols, known for their single "Go Away", the 1993 Pill Popper EP, and 1994 Social Kill full-length CD (Relativity Records). In 1995 they toured with English punk band the UK Subs.

Finneran went on to sing and play guitar in the Hollywood three-piece band Tuscaurora from 1998 until his death in 2009. He wanted to form a band that could play a wider variety of material than the hard-hitting Ex-Idols afforded.

Tuscaurora's 2000 album Malnutrition Headache showed the range of pop/rock/punk influences that melded in Finneran's songwriting style, and in his singing, which varied from raw volatile emotion to beautifully original melodic lines. Music by Tuscaurora was featured in several movies produced by Hart D. Fisher.

Finneran's other music projects included She Died, Tragedy Club, and Gary X and the Fortune Hunters.

Most recently, he was attending the California Institute of the Arts, and expanding his use of keyboards in his songwriting and stage performance.

In 2009, after a long, troubled history with alcohol, Finneran was found dead in a hotel room in Van Nuys, a victim of his own suicide. His Ex-Idols bandmate Duke Decter called Finneran, "one of the best punk-influenced songwriters in American rock & roll." He was survived by three sons: Gary David Finneran, Trevor Finneran, and Joshua Finneran.

References

1964 births
2009 deaths
American punk rock singers
American singer-songwriters
American male singer-songwriters
Relativity Records artists
20th-century American singers
20th-century American male singers